Kings Tower may refer to:

Kings Tower, Sheffield, England
Kings Tower, Lagos, Nigeria